Canadian Western Agribition, otherwise known as simply Agribition, is an annual agricultural trade show held at Evraz Place in Regina, Saskatchewan, typically held during the last week of November.

The show won the 2013 and 2015 Saskatchewan Tourism Award of Excellence for Event of the Year.

History

The first Agribition show was held in Regina from November 30 to December 3, 1971, and has taken place every year since. Chris Sutter of Redvers, Saskatchewan was the first president of Canadian Western Agribition. Bill Small of Craven, Saskatchewan was the show's first vice-president. A book which chronicled the first 29 years of the show, titled Agribition, was published in 1990.

Agribition was to celebrate its 50th year in 2020; it was scheduled to be delayed slightly in order to accommodate the 108th Grey Cup, which was to be hosted by nearby Mosaic Stadium. The event was cancelled and replaced by a virtual event due to the COVID-19 pandemic. 

Agribition returned as an in-person event with virtual components in 2021; organizers projected attendance to have been just over 85,000, a decrease from the 121,000 who attended in 2019. Organizers cited COVID-19 protocols (including Saskatchewan's proof of vaccination rules), a lack of school visitors, and reduced international attendance as factors in the decline, but noted that there was increased interest in its online content. The 2022 show will again be scheduled later than usual due to the Grey Cup.

See also
 Agriculture in Saskatchewan

References

External links
 

Culture of Regina, Saskatchewan
Rodeos
Exhibitions in Canada
Equestrian sports in Canada
Agricultural fairs in Canada
Tourist attractions in Regina, Saskatchewan
Fall events in Canada